Jiří Ptáček (born 15 January 1989) is a Czech football player who currently plays for Loko Vltavín in the Czech 2. Liga.

External links

Czech footballers
1989 births
Living people
Czech First League players
FK Čáslav players
Bohemians 1905 players
FC Silon Táborsko players
Loko Vltavín players
Association football defenders